Patsy Ann Gephardt Kurth (February 2, 1941 – April 27, 2011) was a member of the Florida Senate representing the 16th district from 1990 to 1992 and the 15th district from 1992 to 2000.

She was born in Washington, Missouri on February 2, 1941, and came to Brevard County in 1962.

In 2000, she ran for a seat in the U.S House of Representatives representing Florida's 15th congressional district but was defeated by Dave Weldon.

She was the cousin of Richard Gephardt.

Her daughter, Dawn Ann Kurth, as a 11-year-old, was a spokesperson against false advertising directed toward children during the early 1970s. She died from cancer in 1986.

References

External links
Profile, Legacy.com; accessed June 11, 2017.

1941 births
2011 deaths
Methodists from Florida
Democratic Party Florida state senators
Missouri State University alumni
People from Brevard County, Florida
People from Washington, Missouri